Chityal may refer to:
 Chityal, Jayashankar Bhupalpally district, Telangana, India
 Chityal, Nalgonda district, Telangana, India